The Palauan ambassador in Taipei is the official representative of the government in Ngerulmud to the government of Taiwan.

List of representatives

References 

 
Taiwan
Palau
Palau